In mathematics — specifically, in integration theory — the Alexiewicz norm is an integral norm associated to the Henstock–Kurzweil integral.  The Alexiewicz norm turns the space of Henstock–Kurzweil integrable functions into a topological vector space that is barrelled but not complete.  The Alexiewicz norm is named after the Polish mathematician Andrzej Alexiewicz, who introduced it in 1948.

Definition

Let HK(R) denote the space of all functions f: R → R that have finite Henstock–Kurzweil integral.  Define the Alexiewicz semi-norm of f ∈ HK(R) by

This defines a semi-norm on HK(R);  if functions that are equal Lebesgue-almost everywhere are identified, then this procedure defines a bona fide norm on the quotient of HK(R) by the equivalence relation of equality almost everywhere.  (Note that the only constant function f: R → R that is integrable is the one with constant value zero.)

Properties

 The Alexiewicz norm endows HK(R) with a topology that is barrelled but incomplete.
 The Alexiewicz norm as defined above is equivalent to the norm defined by

 The completion of HK(R) with respect to the Alexiewicz norm is often denoted A(R) and is a subspace of the space of tempered distributions, the dual of Schwartz space.  More precisely, A(R) consists of those tempered distributions that are distributional derivatives of functions in the collection

Therefore, if f ∈ A(R), then f is a tempered distribution and there exists a continuous function F in the above collection such that

for every compactly supported C∞ test function φ: R → R.  In this case, it holds that

 The translation operator is continuous with respect to the Alexiewicz norm.  That is, if for f ∈ HK(R) and x ∈ R the translation Txf of f by x is defined by

then

References

 
 

Norms (mathematics)